Flash Me Magazine is one of the longest running online magazines devoted to publishing flash fiction stories. It is a quarterly publication by Winged Halo Productions. It is a paying market, accepting all genres of fiction under 1,000 words. It is also one of the few markets that offer editorial feedback with rejection letters. Issues are published on January 31, April 30, July 31, and October 31. The magazine has its headquarters in Belleville, Illinois.

Throughout its history, Flash Me Magazine has supported and promoted the art of flash fiction writing with its Lightning Flash Fiction Contests, its Flash For BIG Cash Anthologies, and now with its Flash Fiction Boot Camp series. All proceeds raised from these projects help fund the magazine. The editors of Flash Me Magazine believe flash fiction authors aren't recognized often enough, and choose to showcase one author each quarter as its Feature Story. They also annually nominate authors for the Pushcart Prize.

In addition to the main website, Flash Me Magazine can be found on Facebook  and MySpace. Its official blog, The Slush Pile, offers updates on incoming submissions and other news. Flash Me Magazine can be found in various market listings, most notably in Duotrope and Ralan.com. It is a member of the Speculative Literature Foundation Small Press Co-operative.

Authors
A complete list of all the authors published in Flash Me Magazine can be found in their archives.

These include:
 Ilona Andrews (published in Flash Me Magazine as Andrew & Ilona Gordon)
 Michael Arnzen
 Bruce Boston
 John Bushore
 Elaine Cunningham
 Bruce Holland Rogers
 Marge Simon
 Steven Utley

References

External links
 The Speculative Literature Foundation
 Six Questions For...

2003 establishments in Illinois
American literature websites
Fiction magazines
Magazines established in 2003
Magazines published in Illinois
Online literary magazines published in the United States
Quarterly magazines published in the United States